In enzymology, beta-carotene 15,15'-dioxygenase, is an enzyme with systematic name beta-carotene:oxygen 15,15'-dioxygenase (bond-cleaving). In human it is encoded by the BCDO2 gene. This enzyme catalyses the following chemical reaction

 beta-carotene + O2 → 2 all-trans-retinal

This is a cleavage reaction which cleaves β-carotene, utilizes molecular oxygen, is enhanced by the presence of bile salts and thyroxine, and generates two molecules of retinal. In humans, the enzyme is present in the small intestine and liver. The dioxygenase also asymmetrically cleaves beta-cryptoxanthin, trans-β-apo-8'-carotenal, beta-4'-apo-β-carotenal, alpha-carotene and gamma-carotene in decreasing order, creating one retinal molecule, all of these being substrates with a carbon chain greater than C30, with at least one unsubstituted β-ionone ring.

This enzyme belongs to the (enzymatically-defined) family of oxidoreductases, specifically those acting on paired donors, with O2 as oxidant and incorporation or reduction of oxygen. A related enzyme is β-carotene 15,15'-monooxygenase, coded for by the gene BCMO1, which symmetrically cleaves β-carotene into two retinal molecules.

In general, carnivores are poor converters of ionone-containing carotenoids, and pure carnivores such as felids (cats) lack beta-carotene 15,15'-dioxygenase and beta-carotene 15,15'-monooxygenase and cannot convert any carotenoids to retinal, resulting in none of the carotenoids being forms of vitamin A for these species. They must have preformed vitamin A in their diet.

Beta-carotene 15,15'-dioxygenase belongs to the (similarity-defined) family of carotenoid oxygenases. Enzymes of this family contain a Fe2+ active site, coordinated usually by four His residues.

References 

EC 1.13.11
Iron enzymes
Enzymes of unknown structure